Abanda is a census-designated place and unincorporated community in Chambers County, Alabama, United States. Its population was 133 as of the 2020 census.

History
Abanda was founded when the Atlanta, Birmingham and Atlantic Railroad (ABandA) was extended to that point. A post office was established at Abanda in 1908, and remained in operation until it was discontinued in 1956.

Demographics

Abanda first appeared on the 2010 U.S. Census as a census-designated place (CDP).

Economy
The median household income in Abanda is $13,864 which is considerably smaller than the United States average median income of $53,046. Also, versus the state of Alabama, average median income of $43,160, Abanda is approximately a third that size.

References

Census-designated places in Chambers County, Alabama
Census-designated places in Alabama
Unincorporated communities in Alabama
Unincorporated communities in Chambers County, Alabama